Tom Dick and Harry Mountain is a  volcanic mountain in Clackamas County in the U.S. state of Oregon. Because of its proximity to Mount Hood, it is considered a foothill.

The mountain is named for its three distinct peaks along the summit, forming the cirque that is now part of the Mount Hood Skibowl ski resort.
The name was in use as early as 1897, according to Elijah "Lige" Coalman, the namesake of Coalman Glacier. The mountain has also been called "Tom Dick Mountain" in the past, although the Board on Geographic Names officially decided in favor of including "Harry" in 1969, making the mountain's name a play on the phrase "Tom, Dick and Harry". It has frequently been noted on lists of unusual place names.

Mirror Lake, a popular hiking destination, is located on the north side of the mountain.

Both Tom Dick and Harry Mountain and Zigzag Mountain are capped by Pliocene andesite and basalt.

References 

Cirques of the United States
Mount Hood
Mountains of Clackamas County, Oregon
Mountains of Oregon
Volcanoes of Clackamas County, Oregon
Volcanoes of Oregon